The French Republican calendar, also commonly called the French Revolutionary calendar, was a calendar created and implemented during the French Revolution, and used by the French government for about 12 years from late 1793 to 1805, and for 18 days by the Paris Commune in 1871.

The revolutionary system was designed in part to remove all religious and royalist influences from the calendar, and was part of a larger attempt at decimalisation in France (which also included decimal time of day, decimalisation of currency, and metrication). It was used in government records in France and other areas under French rule, including Belgium, Luxembourg, and parts of the Netherlands, Germany, Switzerland, Malta, and Italy.

Beginning and ending
The National Constituent Assembly at first intended to create a new calendar marking the "era of Liberty", beginning on 14 July 1789, the date of the Storming of the Bastille. However, on 2 January 1792  its successor the Legislative Assembly decided that Year IV of Liberty had begun the day before. Year I had therefore begun on 1 January 1789.

On 21 September 1792, the French First Republic was proclaimed, and the new National Convention decided that 1792 was to be known as Year I of the French Republic. It decreed on 2 January 1793 that Year II of the Republic had begun the day before. However, the new calendar as adopted by the Convention in October 1793 made 22 September 1792 the first day of Year I.

Ultimately, the calendar came to commemorate the Republic, and not the Revolution. The Common Era,  commemorating the birth of Jesus Christ, was abolished and replaced with 'l'ère républicaine', the Republican Era, signifying the "age of reason" overcoming superstition, as part of the campaign of dechristianization.  

The First Republic ended with the coronation of Napoleon I as Emperor on 11 Frimaire, Year XIII, or 2 December 1804. Despite this, the republican calendar continued to be used until 1 January 1806, when Napoleon declared it abolished. It was briefly used again for a few weeks of the Paris Commune, in May 1871.

Overview and origins

Precursor 
The prominent atheist essayist and philosopher Sylvain Maréchal published the first edition of his Almanach des Honnêtes-gens (Almanac of Honest People) in 1788. The first month in the almanac is "Mars, ou Princeps" (March, or First), the last month is "Février, ou Duodécembre" (February, or Twelfth). The lengths of the months are the same as those in the Gregorian calendar; however, the 10th, 20th, and 30th days are singled out of each month as the end of a décade (group of ten days). Individual days were assigned, instead of to the traditional saints, to people noteworthy for mostly secular achievements. Later editions of the almanac would switch to the Republican Calendar.

History 

The days of the French Revolution and Republic saw many efforts to sweep away various trappings of the Ancien Régime (the old feudal monarchy); some of these were more successful than others. The new Republican government sought to institute, among other reforms, a new social and legal system, a new system of weights and measures (which became the metric system), and a new calendar. Amid nostalgia for the ancient Roman Republic, the theories of the Age of Enlightenment were at their peak, and the devisers of the new systems looked to nature for their inspiration. Natural constants, multiples of ten, and Latin as well as Ancient Greek derivations formed the fundamental blocks from which the new systems were built.

They associated with their work the chemist Louis-Bernard Guyton de Morveau, the mathematician and astronomer Joseph-Louis Lagrange, the astronomer Jérôme Lalande, the mathematician Gaspard Monge, the astronomer and naval geographer Alexandre Guy Pingré, and the poet, actor and playwright Fabre d'Églantine, who invented the names of the months, with the help of André Thouin, gardener at the Jardin des plantes of the Muséum National d'Histoire Naturelle in Paris. As the rapporteur of the commission, Charles-Gilbert Romme presented the new calendar to the Jacobin-controlled National Convention on 23 September 1793, which adopted it on 24 October 1793 and also extended it proleptically to its epoch of 22 September 1792. It is because of his position as rapporteur of the commission that the creation of the republican calendar is attributed to Romme.

The calendar is frequently named the "French Revolutionary Calendar" because it was created during the Revolution, but this is a slight misnomer. In France, it is known as the calendrier républicain as well as the calendrier révolutionnaire. There was initially a debate as to whether the calendar should celebrate the Great Revolution, which began in July 1789, or the Republic, which was established in 1792. Immediately following 14 July 1789, papers and pamphlets started calling 1789 year I of Liberty and the following years II and III. It was in 1792, with the practical problem of dating financial transactions, that the legislative assembly was confronted with the problem of the calendar. Originally, the choice of epoch was either 1 January 1789 or 14 July 1789. After some hesitation the assembly decided on 2 January 1792 that all official documents would use the "era of Liberty" and that the year IV of Liberty started on 1 January 1792. This usage was modified on 22 September 1792 when the Republic was proclaimed and the Convention decided that all public documents would be dated Year I of the French Republic. The decree of 2 January 1793 stipulated that the year II of the Republic began on 1 January 1793; this was revoked with the introduction of the new calendar, which set 22 September 1793 as the beginning of year II. The establishment of the Republic was used as the epochal date for the calendar; therefore, the calendar commemorates the Republic, and not the Revolution.

French coins of the period naturally used this calendar.  Many show the year in Arabic numbers, although Roman numerals were used on some issues. Year 11 coins typically have a XI date to avoid confusion with the Roman II.

The French Revolution is usually considered to have ended with the coup of 18 Brumaire, Year VIII (9 November 1799), the coup d'état of Napoleon Bonaparte against the established constitutional regime of the Directoire.

The Concordat of 1801 re-established the Roman Catholic Church as an official institution in France, although not as the state religion of France. The concordat took effect from Easter Sunday, 28 Germinal, Year XI (8 April 1802); it restored the names of the days of the week to the ones from the Gregorian calendar, and fixed Sunday as the official day of rest and religious celebration. However, the other attributes of the republican calendar, the months, and years, remained as they were.

Napoleon finally abolished the republican calendar with effect from 1 January 1806 (the day after 10 Nivôse Year XIV), a little over twelve years after its introduction. It was, however, used again briefly in the Journal officiel for some dates during a short period of the Paris Commune, 6–23 May 1871 (16 Floréal–3 Prairial Year LXXIX).

Calendar design 

Years appear in writing as Roman numerals (usually), with epoch 22 September 1792, the beginning of the "Republican Era" (the day the French First Republic was proclaimed, one day after the Convention abolished the monarchy). As a result, Roman Numeral I indicates the first year of the republic, that is, the year before the calendar actually came into use. By law, the beginning of each year was set at midnight, beginning on the day the apparent autumnal equinox falls at the Paris Observatory.

There were twelve months, each divided into three ten-day weeks called décades. The tenth day, décadi, replaced Sunday as the day of rest and festivity. The five or six extra days needed to approximate the solar or tropical year were placed after the months at the end of each year and called complementary days. This arrangement was an almost exact copy of the calendar used by the Ancient Egyptians, though in their case the beginning of the year was not marked by the autumnal equinox.

A period of four years ending on a leap day was to be called a "Franciade". The name "Olympique" was originally proposed but changed to Franciade to commemorate the fact that it had taken the revolution four years to establish a republican government in France.

The leap year was called Sextile, an allusion to the "bissextile" leap years of the Julian and Gregorian calendars, because it contained a sixth complementary day.

Decimal time 

Each day in the Republican Calendar was divided into ten hours, each hour into 100 decimal minutes, and each decimal minute into 100 decimal seconds. Thus an hour was 144 conventional minutes (2.4 times as long as a conventional hour), a minute was 86.4 conventional seconds (44% longer than a conventional minute), and a second was 0.864 conventional seconds (13.6% shorter than a conventional second).

Clocks were manufactured to display this decimal time, but it did not catch on. Mandatory use of decimal time was officially suspended 7 April 1795, although some cities continued to use decimal time as late as 1801.

The numbering of years in the Republican Calendar by Roman numerals ran counter to this general decimalization tendency.

Months 
The Republican calendar year began the day the autumnal equinox occurred in Paris, and had twelve months of 30 days each, which were given new names based on nature, principally having to do with the prevailing weather in and around Paris and sometimes evoking the Medieval Labours of the Months. The extra five or six days in the year were not given a month designation, but considered Sansculottides or Complementary Days.
 Autumn:
 Vendémiaire (from French vendange, derived from Latin vindemia, "vintage"), starting 22, 23, or 24 September
 Brumaire (from French brume, "mist", from Latin brūma, "winter solstice; winter; winter cold"), starting 22, 23, or 24 October
 Frimaire (from French frimas, "frost"), starting 21, 22, or 23 November
 Winter:
 Nivôse (from Latin nivosus, "snowy"), starting 21, 22, or 23 December
 Pluviôse (from French pluvieux, derived from Latin pluvius, "rainy"), starting 20, 21, or 22 January
 Ventôse (from French venteux, derived from Latin ventosus, "windy"), starting 19, 20, or 21 February
 Spring:
 Germinal (from French germination), starting 20 or 21 March
 Floréal (from French fleur, derived from Latin flos, "flower"), starting 20 or 21 April
 Prairial (from French prairie, "meadow"), starting 20 or 21 May
 Summer:
 Messidor (from Latin messis, "harvest"), starting 19 or 20 June
 Thermidor (or Fervidor) (from Greek thermon, "summer heat"), starting 19 or 20 July
 Fructidor (from Latin fructus, "fruit"), starting 18 or 19 August

Note: On many printed calendars of Year II (1793–94), the month of Thermidor was named Fervidor (from Latin fervidus, "burning hot").

Most of the month names were new words coined from French, Latin, or Greek. The endings of the names are grouped by season. "Dor" means "giving" in Greek.

In Britain, a contemporary wit mocked the Republican Calendar by calling the months: Wheezy, Sneezy and Freezy; Slippy, Drippy and Nippy; Showery, Flowery and Bowery; Hoppy, Croppy and Poppy. The historian Thomas Carlyle suggested somewhat more serious English names in his 1837 work The French Revolution: A History, namely Vintagearious, Fogarious, Frostarious, Snowous, Rainous, Windous, Buddal, Floweral, Meadowal, Reapidor, Heatidor, and Fruitidor. Like the French originals, they are neologisms suggesting a meaning related to the season.

Ten days of the week 

The month is divided into three décades or "weeks" of ten days each, named simply:
 primidi (first day)
 duodi (second day)
 tridi (third day)
 quartidi (fourth day)
 quintidi (fifth day)
 sextidi (sixth day)
 septidi (seventh day)
 octidi (eighth day)
 nonidi (ninth day)
 décadi (tenth day)

Décadis became official days of rest instead of Sundays, in order to diminish the influence of the Catholic Church. They were used for the festivals of a succession of new religions meant to replace Catholicism: the Cult of Reason, the Cult of the Supreme Being, the Decadary Cult, and Theophilanthropy. Christian holidays were officially abolished in favor of revolutionary holidays. 

The law of 13 Fructidor year VI (August 30, 1798) required that marriages must only be celebrated on décadis. This law was  applied from the 1st Vendémiaire year VII (September 22, 1798) to 28 Pluviôse year VIII (February 17, 1800). 

Décades were abandoned at the changeover from Germinal to Floréal an X (20 to 21 April 1802), after Napoleon's Concordat with the Pope.

Rural calendar 
The Catholic Church used a calendar of saints, which named each day of the year after an associated saint. To reduce the influence of the Church, Fabre d'Églantine introduced a Rural Calendar in which each day of the year had a unique name associated with the rural economy, stated to correspond to the time of year. Every décadi (ending in 0) was named after an agricultural tool. Each quintidi (ending in 5) was named for a common animal. The rest of the days were named for "grain, pasture, trees, roots, flowers, fruits" and other plants, except for the first month of winter, Nivôse, during which the rest of the days were named after minerals.

Autumn

Winter

Spring

Summer

Complementary days 

Five extra days – six in leap years – were national holidays at the end of every year. These were originally known as les sans-culottides (after sans-culottes), but after year III (1795) as les jours complémentaires:
 1st complementary day: La Fête de la Vertu, "Celebration of Virtue", on 17 or 18 September
 2nd complementary day: La Fête du Génie, "Celebration of Talent", on 18 or 19 September
 3rd complementary day: La Fête du Travail, "Celebration of Labour", on 19 or 20 September
 4th complementary day: La Fête de l'Opinion, "Celebration of Convictions", on 20 or 21 September
 5th complementary day: La Fête des Récompenses, "Celebration of Honors (Awards)", on 21 or 22 September
 6th complementary day: La Fête de la Révolution, "Celebration of the Revolution", on 22 or 23 September (on leap years only)

Converting from the Gregorian Calendar

During the Republic 

Below are the Gregorian dates each year of the Republican Era (Ere Républicain in French) began while the calendar was in effect.

 Leap years are highlighted
 Extra (sextile) day inserted before date, due to previous leap year

After the Republic

The  Republican Calendar was abolished in the year XIV (1805). After this year, there are two historically attested calendars which may be used to determine dates. Both calendars gave the same dates for years 17 to 52 (1808-1844), always beginning on 23 September, and it was suggested that the revised calendar be implemented during this period, before the Republican Calendar was abolished.
  Republican Calendar: The only legal calendar during the Republic. The first day of the year, 1 Vendémiaire, is always the day autumn begins in Paris. About every 30 years, leap years are 5 years apart instead of 4, as happened between the leap years 15 and 20. The lengths of the first 524 years were calculated by Delambre. 
 Revised Republican Calendar: Following a proposal by Delambre in order to make leap years regular and predictable, with leap years being every year divisible by 4, except years divisible by 100 and not by 400. Years divisible by 4000 would also be ordinary years. Intended to be implemented in year 3, the revised calendar was abandoned after the death of the head of the calendar committee, Gilbert Romme. This calendar also has the benefit that every year in the third century of the Republican Era (1992–2091) begins on 22 September.

Leap years are highlighted
 Extra (sextile) day inserted before date, due to previous leap year

Current date and time 
For this calendar, Romme’s revised method of calculating leap years is used.  Other methods may differ by one day. Time may be cached and therefore not accurate. Decimal time is according to Paris mean time, which is 9 minutes 21 seconds (6.49 decimal minutes) ahead of Greenwich Mean Time. (This tool calibrates the time, if calibration is desired.)

Criticism and shortcomings 

Leap years in the calendar are a point of great dispute, due to the contradicting statements in the establishing decree stating:

and:

These two specifications are incompatible, as leap years defined by the autumnal equinox in Paris do not recur on a regular four-year schedule. Thus, the years III, VII, and XI were observed as leap years, and the years XV and XX were also planned as such, even though they were five years apart.

A fixed arithmetic rule for determining leap years was proposed by Jean Baptiste Joseph Delambre and presented to the Committee of Public Education by Gilbert Romme on 19 Floréal An III (8 May 1795). The proposed rule was to determine leap years by applying the rules of the Gregorian calendar to the years of the French Republic (years IV, VIII, XII, etc. were to be leap years) except that year 4000 (the last year of ten 400-year periods) should be a common year instead of a leap year. Shortly thereafter, Romme was sentenced to the guillotine and committed suicide, and the proposal was never adopted, although Jérôme Lalande repeatedly proposed it for a number of years. The proposal was intended to avoid uncertain future leap years caused by the inaccurate astronomical knowledge of the 1790s (even today, this statement is still valid due to the uncertainty in ΔT). In particular, the committee noted that the autumnal equinox of year 144 was predicted to occur at 11:59:40 pm local apparent time in Paris, which was closer to midnight than its inherent 3 to 4 minute uncertainty.

The calendar was abolished by an act dated 22 Fructidor an XIII (9 September 1805) and signed by Napoleon, which referred to a report by Michel-Louis-Étienne Regnaud de Saint-Jean d'Angély and Jean Joseph Mounier, listing two fundamental flaws.
 The rule for leap years depended upon the uneven course of the sun, rather than fixed intervals, so that one must consult astronomers to determine when each year started, especially when the equinox happened close to midnight, as the exact moment could not be predicted with certainty.
 Both the era and the beginning of the year were chosen to commemorate a historical event that occurred on the first day of autumn in France, whereas the other European nations began the year near the beginning of winter or spring, thus being impediments to the calendar's adoption in Europe and America, and even a part of the French nation, where the Gregorian calendar continued to be used, as it was required for religious purposes.
The report also noted that the 10-day décade was unpopular and had already been suppressed three years earlier in favor of the seven-day week, removing what was considered by some as one of the calendar's main benefits. The 10-day décade was unpopular with laborers because they received only one full day of rest out of ten, instead of one in seven, although they also got a half-day off on the fifth day (thus 36 full days and 36 half days in a year, for a total of 54 free days, compared to the usual 52 or 53 Sundays). It also, by design, conflicted with Sunday religious observances.

Another criticism of the calendar was that despite the poetic names of its months, they were tied to the climate and agriculture of metropolitan France and therefore not applicable to France's overseas territories.

Famous dates and other cultural references 

The "Coup of 18 Brumaire" or "Brumaire" was the coup d'état of Napoleon Bonaparte on 18 Brumaire An VIII (9 November 1799), which many historians consider to be the end of the French Revolution. Karl Marx's 1852 essay The Eighteenth Brumaire of Louis Bonaparte compares the coup d'état of 1851 of Louis Napoléon unfavorably to his uncle's earlier coup, with the statement "History repeats ... first as tragedy, then as farce".

Another famous revolutionary date is 9 Thermidor An II (27 July 1794), the date the Convention turned against Maximilien Robespierre, who, along with others associated with the Mountain, was guillotined the following day. Based on this event, the term "Thermidorian" entered the Marxist vocabulary as referring to revolutionaries who destroy the revolution from the inside and turn against its true aims. For example, Leon Trotsky and his followers used this term about Joseph Stalin.

Émile Zola's novel Germinal takes its name from the calendar's month of Germinal.

The seafood dish Lobster Thermidor was named after the 1891 play Thermidor, set during the Revolution.

The French frigates of the Floréal class all bear names of Republican months.

The Convention of 9 Brumaire An III, 30 October 1794, established the École normale supérieure. The date appears prominently on the entrance to the school.

The French composer Fromental Halévy was born 7 Prairial VIII (27 May 1799), the day of fromental (oatgrass).

Neil Gaiman's The Sandman series included a story called "Thermidor" that takes place in that month during the French Revolution.

See also 

 Agricultural cycle
 Calendar reform
 Dechristianisation of France
 Decimal time
 Soviet calendar
 Solar Hijri calendar, astronomical equinox-based calendar used in Iran
 World Calendar

References

Further reading 

 Ozouf, Mona, 'Revolutionary Calendar' in Furet, François and Mona Ozouf, eds., Critical Dictionary of the French Revolution (1989)
 Shaw, Matthew, Time and the French Revolution: a history of the French Republican Calendar, 1789-Year XIV (2011)

External links 

 Date converter for numerous calendars, including this one
 iCalendar files for the French Republican calendar, for use in Outlook, Google Calendar, etc.
 Dials & Symbols of the French revolution. The Republican Calendar and Decimal time.

 
Obsolete calendars
Decimal time
Calendar
Calendar
Calendar
1792 establishments in France
1790s in France
1800s in France